Presidential elections were held in Chile on February 1, 1942. The result was a victory for Juan Antonio Ríos of the Radical Party, who received 56% of the vote.

Electoral system
The election was held using the absolute majority system, under which a candidate had to receive over 50% of the popular vote to be elected. If no candidate received over 50% of the vote, both houses of the National Congress would come together to vote on the two candidates who received the most votes.

Background
In 1941, due to his rapidly escalating illness, President Pedro Aguirre Cerda appointed his Minister of the Interior, Jerónimo Méndez as vice-president and died soon after, on November 25, 1941. Aguirre Cerda's two natural successors were Juan Antonio Ríos and Gabriel González Videla, both members of his Radical Party, while the right-wing coalition was united by a common candidate, former President Carlos Ibáñez del Campo, who had the support of the Conservative party, Liberal Party, National Socialist Party, Popular Socialist Vanguard and the majority of the independents.

Ríos started to campaign early but two days before the internal primaries of his party, Gabriel González Videla (the ambassador to Brazil) returned to Chile to dispute him the nomination. The results were too close to call, so a tribunal of honor (electoral commission) was constituted, and Juan Antonio Ríos was finally proclaimed the candidate of a left-wing coalition of parties, the Democratic Alliance, which was formed by the Radical Party, the Socialist Party, the Communist Party, the Democratic Party and the Workers' Socialist Party.

One of the candidates in the election was identified by American and British intelligence as an ally of the Axis countries, which led to debates in the US government about intervening in the election and abandoning Franklin D. Roosevelt's Good Neighbor policy.

Results

References

Presidential elections in Chile
1942 in Chile
Chile
February 1942 events
Election and referendum articles with incomplete results